Santenay may refer to:

Places 
 Santenay, Côte-d'Or, France
 Santenay, Loir-et-Cher, France

Other uses 
 Santenay AOC, a wine classification
 Ensemble Santenay, a German early music ensemble